Celestún is a town in Yucatán, Mexico. It is located in the northwest corner of the state, just north of the border with the state of Campeche, on the Gulf of Mexico coast at
.

In 2000, it had a population of just under 6,000 people; however, the population swells to 10,000 during the octopus hunting season. It is mostly a fishing town, with a 19th-century lighthouse (as well as a more modern one) and an abandoned historic hacienda. Besides fishing, Celestún also produces salt, as it has done from pre-Columbian times. Tourism is also making up an increasing portion of the town's economy, as the community has many kilometers of sand beaches and abundant wildlife.

Surrounding the town is the 147,500-acre (600 km²) Ría Celestún Biosphere Reserve, a wetland reserve that is the winter home to vast flocks of flamingos, as well as many herons and other bird species. This location is set within the Petenes mangroves ecoregion. In addition, more than 200 species of birds pass through on migration, or live there.  Celestun's ecosystem is unique because of a combination of freshwater from the century estuary and saltwater from the Gulf of Mexico. The reserve also has two types of pelicans - large white Canadian and smaller gray Mexican ones.  Celestun is also known as a hatching ground for endangered sea turtles.  Wildlife conservationists have an ongoing project to protect the sea turtles from encroaching modernization.

One of the busiest times for tourism is Holy Week, when people from around the region visit Celestun. Local folk-catholic traditions are abundant during this time, when the town's patron saint is floated out to sea surrounded by candles, and visited by the patron saint of nearby Kinchil.

As the town of Celestun is the seat of the municipality (municipio) of Celestun, it attracts various carnivals, dances and musicians to its town square on a regular basis.

Climate

References

External links

 Celestún Lagoon Photo Essay
Karst and Colors on the Yucatán Peninsula near Celestún NASA Earth Observatory, May 8, 2022

Populated places in Yucatán
Tourism in Mexico